"No Time" is a song by Australian rock band Mondo Rock, released in June 1982 as the lead single from the band's third album Nuovo Mondo. It peaked at number 11 on the Kent Music Report.

According to Eric McCusker the song was inspired by The Beatles' "Don't Let Me Down", as a tribute to John Lennon.

Track listing 
 "No Time" (Eric McCusker) - 4:03
 "Il Mondo Caffe" (James Black, Ross Wilson) - 2:48

Charts

References 

Mondo Rock songs
1982 singles
1982 songs
Warner Music Group singles